The Temple of Concordia is an ancient Greek temple in the Valle dei Templi (Valley of the Temples) in Agrigento (Greek: Akragas) on the south coast of Sicily, Italy. It is the largest and best-preserved Doric temple in Sicily and one of the best-preserved Greek temples in general, especially of the Doric order. It is located a kilometer east to the Temple of Heracles.

Description

The temple was built  BC.

It is constructed, like the nearby Temple of Juno, on a solid base designed to overcome the unevenness of the rocky terrain. It has been conventionally named after Concordia, the Roman goddess of harmony, for the Roman-era Latin inscription found nearby, which is unrelated to it.

If still in use by the 4th-and 5th century, it would have been closed during the persecution of pagans in the late Roman Empire. The temple was converted into a Christian basilica in the 6th century dedicated to the apostles Peter and Paul by San Gregorio delle Rape, bishop of Agrigento and thus survived the destruction of pagan places of worship. The spaces between the columns were filled with walling, altering its Classical Greek form. The division between the cella, the main room where the cult statue would have stood in antiquity, and the opisthodomos, an adjoining room, was destroyed, and the walls of the cella were cut into a series of arches along the nave. The Christian refurbishments were removed during the restoration of 1785. According to another source, the Prince of Torremuzza transferred the altar elsewhere and began restoration of the classic building in 1788.

According to authors of a 2007 article, it is "apart from the Parthenon, the best preserved Doric temple in the world."

Gallery

See also
 List of Ancient Greek temples

References

Bibliography

5th-century BC religious buildings and structures
Concordia
Buildings and structures in the Province of Agrigento
Valle dei Templi
5th-century BC establishments in Italy
Roman temples by deity
Archaeological sites in Sicily